Dax Charles is a former NCAA Division II national champion wrestler  and current wrestling coach at Colorado State University Pueblo. He has also been elected to the Division II Hall of Fame. In 1992, he became the first winner of a national championship title in the 150 lb class at the then University of Southern Colorado. He has also been awarded All American Honors in 1991, 1992 and 1994  including All American Academic honors in 1994.

References

Living people
American wrestling coaches
Colorado State University faculty
CSU Pueblo ThunderWolves wrestlers
CSU Pueblo ThunderWolves wrestling coaches
American wrestlers
Year of birth missing (living people)